Golimaar is a 2010 Indian Telugu-language action crime film written and directed by Puri Jagannadh. Produced by Bellamkonda Suresh under Sri Sai Ganesh Productions banner, it stars Gopichand and Priyamani  and features music composed by Chakri. The film is inspired by the life of Daya Nayak, a police officer who became an encounter specialist and was known for his record number of encounter killings in the late 1990s.

The narrative revolves around Gangaram, an orphan who grows up to become an honest cop. With his sharpshooting abilities, he becomes an encounter specialist who starts shaking the foundations of two gangsters, Talwar and Khalid. But things take an ugly turn when he gets betrayed by his own colleagues in his department and eventually loses his job. Rest of the story deals with how Gangaram finds and kills the main culprits and corrupt officers in his department & the mastermind behind this.

The film was released on 27 May 2010 and received positive reviews for its action sequences, performances (especially Gopichand & Nassar), score, cinematography, Jagannath’s direction and dialogues. It became a critical and commercial success. The film ran for more than 50 days at 79 cinemas. Geetha Madhuri won the Filmfare Award for Best Female Playback Singer for the film's song "Magallu".

Plot
Gangaram (Gopichand), an orphan, grows up to become an honest police officer. DIG Bharath Nandan (Nassar) promotes him to encounter specialists after being impressed with his fighting and shooting skills. ACP Patnayak (Mukhtar Khan) becomes jealous of Gangaram who starts eliminating criminals one by one with the help of his team and becomes famous for the encounter killings. He now intends to bring down the two gangster networks of Talwar (Shawar Ali) who are operating in the city, and Khalid (Kelly Dorji) who is operating from Malaysia. Along with his team, Gangaram attacks Talwar but runs out of ammo before he can shoot him. Patyanak arrives and arrests him, much to Gangaram's disappointment. Later, Talwar injures himself in an attempt to escape from the hospital, but Gangaram accompanies and kills him along with his henchmen. Learning Khalid is in Kenya for a one-day private trip, Gangaram decides to go there to kill him but the DIG asks him to tender his resignation due to the confidentiality of the operation. While Gangaram is at home with his girlfriend Pavitra (Priyamani), Patnayak and other officers raid his house and arrest him on the charges of mafia connections. Learning from Khalid on phone in custody that he was used by Khalid and the DIG to eliminate their opponent Talwar, Gangaram escapes and in a media, interview explains how he was framed despite his honesty. Gangaram now becomes gangster "Gangu Bhai" and starts eliminating the police officers involved in the encounter attempt on him.

Patnayak arrests and tortures Pavitra to find out Gangaram's location. Learning this, Gangaram gets Patnayak killed by one of his henchmen as Pavitra recovers in the hospital. Pavitra's mother Arundhati (Roja) is taken away by police officers and the DIG, revealed to be her estranged husband, asks her to make Gangaram spare his life for the sake of Pavitra. However, she tells him on the phone to kill the DIG, further explaining how he betrayed her. The DIG shoots her dead, following which Gangaram uses him to find out Khalid's location in Malaysia. After killing the DIG, Gangaram goes to Malaysia where he makes one of Khalid's henchmen named David to help him in killing other henchmen at gunpoint. However, Gangaram is beaten up and questioned by Khalid who believes someone has helped him. Making Khalid suspect his henchmen, Gangaram gets into a fight and kills the henchmen in an ensuing chase. Khalid rushes to a helipad, where Gangaram kills the pilot and fights with Khalid. Learning Khalid's real name is Anthony who has been living in Malaysia with a Mexican passport, Gangaram shoots him dead and informs the DGP (Prakash Raj) about the same (The whole plan was made by Gangaram with the DGP helping him). Gangaram wants to return to India and resume his duties, but the DGP instead tells him to stay there and operate his gang to keep the mafia under the police. Gangaram agrees and calls his henchmen, Pavitra and Gopi (Ali) to settle in Malaysia.

Cast
                             
Gopichand as Sub-Inspector Gangaram
Priyamani as Pavitra
Prakash Raj as DGP (cameo appearance in climax)
Roja Selvamani as Arundhati, Pavitra's mother and Bharat Nandan's estranged wife.
Nassar as DIG Bharat Nandan  
Kelly Dorji as Khalid 
Shawar Ali as Talwar 
Mukhtar Khan as ACP Patnayak 
M. S. Narayana as Hotel Babai
Ali as Gopi 
Jeeva as Police Constable 
Satyam Rajesh as Rajesh
Pruthviraj as Laxmikant Reddy
Salim Baig as David, Khalid's henchman
Pavala Syamala as a maid
Junior Relangi as man at grocery shop
Dheer Charan Srivastav as a pimp

Soundtrack

Music composed by Chakri. Lyrics were written by Bhaskarabhatla. Music released on ADITYA Music Company. Raghu Kunche was originally announced as composer but he was replaced by Puri's usual composer Chakri collaborating with Puri for the tenth time. The music was released on 5 May at a function organized in Club Jayabheri.

Production
After delivering an average grosser in the form of Ek Niranjan, Puri Jagan announced that his next project is with Gopichand titled as Golimaar (గోలీమార్) and it is said that his character will be an encounter specialist. Hansika Motwani was originally announced as heroine but actress denied being part of this film. She was replaced by Priyamani, during the shooting she reported to have fought with producer Bellamkonda Suresh over remuneration. Shooting started on 21 December 2009 at Jubilee hills in Hyderabad. Golimaars unit was filming a scene in the Kukatpally area, when some agitators, who identified themselves as belonging to the Telangana Rashtra Samithi, barged in and disrupted the shoot.  Director Puri Jagannadh was present on the spot. The grouse of the activists was that the Roja, an ex-TDP member, and a supposedly Samaikhya Andhra proponent, was shooting there.  The activists were not ready to allow Roja to shoot in the Telangana region. Following the fracas, the unit decided to wrap up the shooting without completing the day's schedule.  That was a fresh incident of violence or attempted violence against a Tollywood film unit. The police stepped in at the right moment and dispersed the mob.  In view of the law and order problem it posed to the area in the KPHB colony, they asked the unit to leave the place. Roja went away from the spot following the incident.

Awards
Filmfare Awards
 Won
Best Female Playback Singer - Geetha Madhuri - "Magallu"
 Nominated
Best Supporting Actress - Roja Selvamani
Best Lyricist - Bhaskarbatla Ravi Kumar - "Gundello Edo Sadi"

Release
The film was certified "A" by CBFC.

Critical reception
Fullhyd.com gave the film 3.5 stars out of 5 and praised the construction of Gopichand's character and his act, action scenes, dialogues and writing but criticized the "done-to-death villainy and the super-predictability of the script". 123Telugu.com gave the film 3.25 stars out of 5 and felt the film had a more practical approach than other Telugu action films at portraying the hero as a morally right person. The reviewer also praised the performances, action scenes, cinematography, punch dialogues and the fast pace, while criticizing the similarity to Pokiri and Ram Gopal Varma's films, the depiction of police and mafia leaders as "stupid in more than one scene" and the lifting of two songs from world hit numbers. Oneindia.in praised Gopichand and Roja's performances, action scenes, cinematography, production values and Jagannadh's direction. Greatandhra wrote:"This is not to compare the film with ‘Pokiri’ but for a man who has given us a marvel like that, ‘Golimaar’ is definitely not a flick of his caliber". Supergoodmovies wrote:"The film creates an interesting plot after the interval, but lack of emotions and comedy has turned thumbs down for the film. Mind you, there’s humor mixed with action punched dialogues like in ‘’Pokiri’, but Puri could not sustain the momentum all through making the plot clearly evident. He even showcases police officers as unintelligent in many scenes". Telugu cinema wrote:"Golimaar is strictly okay. Nothing new, nothing exciting. Just plain, ordinary, masala action film from Puri". Rediff wrote:"The screenplay has its highs and lows. Puri Jagan adds humour in small doses to break the serious nature of the film. Somehow Puri Jagan cannot get over the Pokkiri hangover which has been looming large in his films. He functions within the same format (run-of-the-mill storylines) and style, and hence his films are pretty predictable. He covers up the deficiencies in the story with slick techniques (sound, camera work, fight orchestration, jump cuts in editing etc). The pitfalls in the police system he has brought out are nothing new". Sify wrote:"Golimaar unleashes a feel among the audience that the gap between the thoughts of Puri Jagan and their reach with the spectators is widening with each film".

Box-office
The film was said to be completed 50 days in 79 centres.

Home Video
The Hindi dubbed version was released on DVD, VCD and also on YouTube by Aditya Music in 2011. The Telugu version was made available to stream online via Sun NXT.

References

External links 

2010 films
2010s Telugu-language films
2010 action films
Indian action films
Films directed by Puri Jagannadh
Fictional portrayals of the Andhra Pradesh Police
2010 masala films
Films scored by Chakri
Films shot in Hyderabad, India
Films shot in Malaysia
Films set in Hyderabad, India